is a village located in Sōraku District, Kyoto Prefecture, Japan.

Geography
The total area is 64.11 km².

Neighboring municipalities
Kyoto Prefecture
Sōraku District（Kasagi・Wazuka）
Mie Prefecture
Iga
Nara Prefecture
Nara
Shiga Prefecture
Kōka

Demographics
Per Japanese census data, the population of Minamiyamashiro has declined in recent decades.

Transportation

Railways

Conventional lines
 West Japan Railway Company（JR West）
Kansai Main Line：-  -  -

Roads

Japan National Route

Local attractions

Shurine
Rokusyojinjya

References

External links 

Minamiyamashiro official website 

Villages in Kyoto Prefecture